Aghmamedlo is a village in Georgia’s Kvemo Kartli region with the population of 2289. It had 2867 inhabitants in 2002.

Demography

References

Populated places in Marneuli Municipality